Several chronologies in the archaeology of the Americas include a Formative Period or Formative stage etc. It is often sub-divided, for example into "Early", "Middle" and "Late" stages.  

The Formative is the third of five stages defined by Gordon Willey and Philip Phillips in their 1958 book Method and Theory in American Archaeology.  Cultures of the Formative Stage are supposed to possess the technologies of pottery, weaving, and developed food production; normally they are very largely reliant on agriculture. Social organization is supposed to involve permanent towns and villages, as well as the first ceremonial centers. Ideologically, an early priestly class or theocracy is often present or in development. 

Sometimes also referred to as the "Pre-Classic stage", it followed the Archaic stage and was superseded by the Classic stage.

 The Lithic stage
 The Archaic stage
 The Formative stage
 The Classic stage
 The Post-Classic stage

The dates, and the characteristics of the period called "Formative" vary considerably between different parts of the Americas. The typical broad use of the terms is as follows below.

North America
In the classification of North American chronology, the Formative Stage or  "Neo-Indian period" is a term applied to theoretical North American cultures that existed between 1000 BC and 500 AD. There are alternative classification systems, and this ranking would overlap what others classify as the Woodland period cultures.  

The Formative, Classic and post-Classic stages  are sometimes incorporated together as the Post-archaic period, which runs from 1000 BC to the present.  Sites and cultures include: Adena, Old Copper, Oasisamerica, Woodland, Fort Ancient, Hopewell tradition and Mississippian cultures.

Meso-America
In Mesoamerican chronology the Preclassic or Formative runs from about 2000 BC to 250 AD, covering all the Olmec culture, and the early stages of the Maya culture and Zapotec civilization.

South America
In the periodization of pre-Columbian Peru the Formative Period divides into 1) the Initial Period, from 1800 BC – 900 BC  (sites & cultures: Early Chiripa, Kotosh culture, Cupisnique, Las Haldas, Sechin Alto), and 2) the Early Horizon or Formative Period, 900 BC – 200 BC, (Chavín, Late Chiripa,  Paracas, Chankillo).

See also
:Category:Archaeology of the Americas
Mound Builders
Southeastern Ceremonial Complex

References

 
1958 introductions
1950s neologisms
+3
+3
2nd millennium BC
1st millennium BC
1st century
20th-century BC establishments
5th-century disestablishments